Wax or the Discovery of Television Among the Bees is the first independent feature film by American filmmaker and artist David Blair. It was also the first film on the Internet.

Synopsis
Blair performs in the film, which additionally features a cameo by William Burroughs. As an anti-war statement, Wax provided an early critique of the Gulf War and current-day drone warfare. It is a combination of digital animation, found footage, and live action.

Production
Wax or the Discovery of Television Among the Bees and Waxweb have been supported by substantial grants, co-production, and international sales. Grants for this project include three awards from the New York State Council for the Arts, National Endowment for the Arts, New York Foundation for the Arts, American Film Institute, Jerome Foundation, and Checkerboard Foundation.

Reception
Released in 1991, Wax was a cult hit, playing cinemas in 26 U.S. cities and had additional theatrical play in Japan and Australia. Wax was a co-production with ZDF, German Television, and opened theatrically to rave reviews at the Public Theater in New York. Wax was included in a number of 10 Best Film lists that year.

Legacy
As the first film streamed across the Internet in 1993, the New York Times declaring Wax or the Discovery of Television Among the Bees an “historic event.” That same year, the hypermedia version of the film, Waxweb, was one of the first sites on the World Wide Web, and thus has been repeatedly cited as a milestone of Internet Art. Waxweb has been presented in museums worldwide. Wax or the Discovery of Television Among the Bees was an early example of digital cinema, was one of the first independent films to be edited on a digital non-linear system, the Montage Picture Processor, and transferred from video to film for theatrical presentation.

See also
Waxweb
Internet art
History of the Internet

References

External links
 
  
 Review: A Moral and Political Film under the Visual Overload

1991 films
American avant-garde and experimental films
Cyberpunk films
American independent films
Internet films
1990s science fiction films
William S. Burroughs
1990s avant-garde and experimental films
Collage film
1990s English-language films
1990s American films